SP Books is an independent publishing house specialised in the publication of limited facsimile editions of literary manuscripts.

Founded in 2012 by Nicolas Tretiakow and Jessica Nelson, SP Books has published the manuscripts of major literary figures including Francis Scott Fitzgerald, Mary Shelley, Oscar Wilde, Victor Hugo, Virginia Woolf, Marcel Proust, Lewis Carroll, Jules Verne & Charlotte Brontë.

Based in Paris, France, SP Books publishes oversize, slipcased books that are printed on deluxe paper and feature facsimiles of the handwritten manuscripts, with revisions and notes. Most print runs are limited and hand-numbered.

“SP” stands for “Saints Peres”, district of Paris where the company was originally founded

References 

Book publishing companies of France